Aleochara sulcicollis is a species of rove beetle in the family Staphylinidae. It is found in Central America, North America, and South America. Its larval stage is associated with macroalgae as the species is a parasitoid of kelp flies.

References

Further reading

 
 

Aleocharinae
Articles created by Qbugbot
Beetles described in 1843